The 65th Primetime Emmy Awards, honoring the best in prime time television programming from June 1, 2012 until May 31, 2013, were held on Sunday, September 22, 2013 at the Nokia Theatre in Downtown Los Angeles, California. CBS televised the ceremony within the United States. Actor Neil Patrick Harris hosted the Primetime Emmys for the second time. The Creative Arts Emmy Awards ceremony was held on September 15.

Breaking Bad won Outstanding Drama Series for the first half of its fifth season, while Modern Family won Outstanding Comedy Series for the fourth consecutive time.

Netflix made history by earning the first Primetime Emmy Award nominations for original online only streaming television. Three of its web series, Arrested Development, Hemlock Grove, and House of Cards, earned a total of 14 nominations. Netflix also made history with three wins, including Outstanding Directing for a Drama Series for the pilot episode, "Chapter 1", of House of Cards, as well as a pair of Creative Arts Emmy Awards, making "Chapter 1" the first Primetime Emmy Award-winning webisode.

Winners and nominees

Winners are listed first and highlighted in bold:

Programs

Acting

Lead performances

Supporting performances

Choreography

Directing

Writing

Academy's "hanging episodes" rule

The Television Academy was alerted to an issue with "hanging episodes" by Starz. The channel has numerous series with multiple "hanging episodes". "Hanging episodes" are episodes broadcast after the Academy's deadline for consideration that are part of a season that began before the deadline. For instance, in 2012, Starz's Magic City and AMC's Mad Men both ended their seasons in June, after the May 31 deadline. These episodes were allowed to be webcast for award consideration prior to their telecast should that telecast air after the submission period has closed. The Academy had prior rules stipulating that eligible episodes be presented on the same platform as the episodes that qualify the series.

Most major nominations
By network
 HBO – 34
 ABC / NBC – 15
 Showtime – 14
 AMC – 12
 FX – 9
 PBS – 8
 Fox – 7
 CBS – 6
 Netflix / Sundance Channel – 5
 USA – 3

By program
 Breaking Bad (AMC) – 8
 30 Rock (NBC) / Downton Abbey (PBS) / Homeland (Showtime) / Modern Family (ABC) – 7
 Behind the Candelabra (HBO) – 6

Most major awards
By network
 HBO – 7
 Showtime – 4
 ABC / NBC – 3
 AMC / Comedy Central – 2

By program
 Behind the Candelabra (HBO) – 3
 Breaking Bad (AMC) / The Colbert Report (Comedy Central) / Homeland (Showtime) / Modern Family (ABC) / Veep (HBO) – 2

Notes

Presenters and performers
The awards were presented by the following:

Presenters

Performers

In Memoriam
Prior to the In Memoriam segment:

 Robin Williams presented a tribute to Jonathan Winters
 Rob Reiner presented a tribute to Jean Stapleton
 Jane Lynch presented a tribute to Cory Monteith
 Michael J. Fox presented a tribute to Gary David Goldberg
 Edie Falco presented a tribute to James Gandolfini

A video was then presented paying tribute to the TV stars and well known behind-the-scenes workers who had died since the previous Primetime Emmy Awards broadcast, including:

 David Frost
 Dennis Farina
 Annette Funicello
 Eydie Gormé
 Dale Robertson
 Larry Hagman
 Leslie Frankenheimer
 Conrad Bain
 Maxine Stuart
 Lee Thompson Young
 Preston Davis
 Alan Kirschenbaum
 James Loper
 Lou Myers
 Milo O'Shea
 Fran Bascom
 Lois Smith
 Roger Ebert
 Emily Squires
 Bonnie Dore
 Eileen Brennan
 Bonnie Franklin
 Russell Means
 Milt Hoffman
 Jack Shea
 Jeanne Cooper
 Allan Arbus
 Henry Bromell
 David Connell
 Charles Durning
 Richard Matheson
 Harry Carey Jr.
 Ken Venturi
 Pat Summerall
 Steve Sabol
 Alex Karras
 Jack Klugman
 Jenni Rivera
 Eddie Michaels
 Michael Ansara
 Charles Lisanby
 Fay Kanin
 Emanuel Steward
 Ray Dolby
 Julie Harris
 Deborah Raffin
 Patti Page
 Andy Williams

Reception

Critical
The reviews for the ceremony were mostly negative. Brian Lowry of Variety panned the show, writing: "By the time the show was over, it was hard not to think we could have done with at least one less musical number, or one less memorial tribute, in order to let the winners — including high-profile ones in major categories — actually deliver an acceptance speech without hearing piano music kick in just as they started warming up." Melisa Maerz of Entertainment Weekly also gave the ceremony a negative review, writing: "All of which begged the question: What does the Emmys really offer us, anyway, that we can't get elsewhere? Witty banter? (There was more of that online.) Red-carpet gawking? (Nothing here that you can't see on Instagram.) Exclusive access to the Mani Cam? If you're only tuning in to see which under-appreciated shows to add to your DVR queue, well, Twitter can tell you that better than the Emmys, especially when a mediocre season of Modern Family wins against Louie, Girls, and Veep. The one thing the Emmys is still very good at? Creating consensus. But maybe that's the problem. This year, the consensus was that the Emmys were bad."

Ratings
The broadcast received 17.63 million viewers, the largest audience in total viewers since 2005.

References

External links
 Emmys.com list of 2013 Nominees & Winners
 Academy of Television Arts and Sciences website
 

065
2013 in American television
2013 television awards
2013 in Los Angeles
2013 awards in the United States
September 2013 events in the United States